Tamara James (born June 13, 1984) is an American basketball former player, formerly of the WNBA's Washington Mystics. She is an alumna of the University of Miami, where she majored in liberal arts with a concentration in theater studies. James was selected by the Mystics in the first round, the eighth overall pick in the 2006 WNBA Draft. James spent 9 years as a professional basketball player, mostly overseas in Israel. In Israel, James won 2 Cup Championships and 1 League Championship Wite Maccabi Bnot Ashdod. She had a son in 2011. On November 8, 2016, James was elected Mayor of Dania Beach, the oldest community in Broward County, Florida.

Miami (Florida) statistics

Source

References

External links
 WNBA Profile
 Miami Hurricanes profile

1984 births
Living people
African-American basketball players
American women's basketball players
Basketball players from Florida
McDonald's High School All-Americans
Miami Hurricanes women's basketball players
Parade High School All-Americans (girls' basketball)
People from Dania Beach, Florida
Small forwards
James, Tamara
Washington Mystics draft picks
Washington Mystics players
Women mayors of places in Florida
21st-century African-American sportspeople
21st-century African-American women
20th-century African-American people
20th-century African-American women
Sportspeople from Broward County, Florida